A New Hope is the second studio album by American post-hardcore band Vanna. The album was released on March 24, 2009, through Epitaph Records. A video was made for the song "Safe To Say."

Track listing
Let's Have An Earthquake! – 1:23
Into Hell's Mouth We March – 3:04
The Same Graceful Wind – 4:05
Like Changing Seasons – 4:03
Trashmouth – 2:32
Safe to Say  – 4:07
We Are Nameless – 4:06
Sleepwalker – 4:09
Where We Are Now – 4:12
Ten Arms – 4:04
Life & Limb – 4:05
The Sun Sets Here – 4:14

Personnel
Chris Preece – unclean vocals 
Nick Lambert – rhythm guitar, backing vocals
Evan Pharmakis – lead guitar, clean vocals, keyboard, programming, lead vocals Track 9
Shawn Marquis – bass, backing vocals
Chris Campbell – drums, percussion
Produced and mixed by Steve Evetts
Mixed by Alan Douches

References

2009 albums
Vanna (band) albums
Epitaph Records albums
Albums produced by Steve Evetts